Eric Person (born May 2, 1963 in St. Louis, Missouri) is an American alto and soprano saxophone player and leader of Meta-Four and Metamorphosis. Since coming to New York City in 1982, Person has performed and recorded with jazz masters McCoy Tyner, Dave Holland, Houston Person, Donald Byrd, Chico Hamilton, John Hicks and the World Saxophone Quartet, and rock, funk and world music figures like Vernon Reid, Ben Harper, Ofra Haza and Bootsy Collins.

1982-92 New York City
Eric arrived in New York City on May 17, 1982. Shortly after he arrived, Eric played his first New York City gigs with the John Hicks Big Band at the Public Theater.  In September 1983 he auditioned for drummer Chico Hamilton. He would perform with Mr. Hamilton off and on throughout the 80's and 90's. With Chico, Person would tour the United States, Europe and Japan and record six CD releases with him.

Recordings
 (1993) Arrival
 (1994) Prophecy
 (1997) More Tales To Tell 
 (1999) Extra Pressure
 (2003) Live at Big Sur
 (2005) Reflections
 (2007) Rhythm Edge
 (2010) The Grand Illusion
 (2012) Thoughts on God
 (2015) DuoScope
 (2022) Blue Vision   featuring tenor saxophonist Houston Person
With Ronald Shannon Jackson 
 (1985) Decode Yourself (Island Records)
 (1986) Live at the Caravan of Dreams Ronald Shannon Jackson Album (Caravan of Dreams)
 (1987) When Colors Play 
 (1988) Texas ("Talkeye")
 (1990) Taboo (Virgin Records)
 (2000) Live at Greenwich House 
With Dave Holland
  (1995) Dream of the Elders (ECM Records)
  (2004) Rarum, Vol. 10: Selected Recordings

With Chico Hamilton
  (1988) Euphoria
  (1991) Arroyo
 (1993) Trio!
  (1994) My Panamanian Friend (The music of Eric Dolphy)
  (1999) Timely
  (2001) Foreststorn (with Arthur Blythe and Steve Turre)

With Chris Joris
   (2007) Rainbow Country (De Werf Records)
   (2011) Marie's Momentum

With John Esposito
    (2006) The Blue People
    (2008) A Book of Five Rings (Sunjump Records)

With Ben Harper
    (1997)  The Will to Live (Virgin Records)
    (1997)  Jah Work (EP)
With World Saxophone Quartet
    (1994) Moving Right Along

References

External links
 Official website
[ Allmusic]

American jazz saxophonists
American male saxophonists
Musicians from St. Louis
1963 births
Living people
World Saxophone Quartet members
21st-century American saxophonists
Jazz musicians from Missouri
21st-century American male musicians
American male jazz musicians